Bilbrey is a surname. Notable people with the surname include:

Jim Bilbrey (1924–1985), American baseball player
John Bilbrey, American business executive
Keith Bilbrey (born 1952), American country music disc jockey and television host